Jeffrey Edward Gray (born April 10, 1963) is a former professional baseball relief pitcher who played in Major League Baseball (MLB) for the Cincinnati Reds in 1988 and for the Boston Red Sox in 1990 and 1991. He was signed by the Philadelphia Phillies in 1984 out of Florida State University.

Playing career
A forkball specialist, Gray started his professional career in 1984 in the Philadelphia Phillies' minor-league system, pitching for two years before joining the Cincinnati Reds organization. In 1986, he posted a 14–2 record with a 2.35 ERA and 15 saves for the Double-A Vermont Reds. Gray played in Triple-A for the Nashville Sounds in 1987, compiling a 4.86 ERA in 53 appearances. Returning to Nashville in 1988, he went 8–5 with five saves and a 1.97 in 42 appearances, and was promoted to the Reds during midseason. He recorded a 3.86 ERA in five MLB games and did not have a decision. He returned to Triple-A Nashville for the 1989 season, logging a 3.66 ERA in 44 games.

Gray rejoined the Phillies organization before the 1990 season. At the end of spring training, he was told by the Phillies that he had not made the major-league roster; they asked him to go to Double-A Reading. Gray rejected the offer and signed with the Boston Red Sox organization. After starting the season in Triple-A with the Pawtucket Red Sox, he was promoted to Boston mid-season a become a significant contributor to the American League East division winners. Gray collected nine saves, and seven of them came in seven chances from August 19 through September 10 as he filled in for injured closer Jeff Reardon. In the postseason, Boston was eliminated by the Oakland Athletics in the American League Championship Series; Gray made two appearances, allowing two runs (one earned) in  innings pitched.

Gray returned to Boston for the 1991 season, where he made 50 relief appearances through late July. One of the best middle relievers of the league at this time, he had allowed only 39 hits in  innings, with a 2.34 ERA. Opposing batters had a .181 batting average against him (left-handed .200, right-handed .161).

Injury
On July 30, 1991, Gray was preparing to go out onto the field for his daily routine. He never made it, as his right side went numb, and he suffered what was later diagnosed as a kind of stroke, ending what had been a brilliant season.

Gray missed the rest of the 1991 and 1992 seasons while recuperating from the stroke. He attempted to return to baseball over the following two seasons, but had lost a lot of velocity on his fastball and was never able to return to the majors.

In a three-season major-league career, Gray posted a 4–7 record with a 3.33 ERA and 10 saves in 96 appearances, including a 3.31 strikeout-to-walk ratio (96-to-29) in  innings pitched.

Post-playing career
Gray returned to the game as a pitching coach. As of 2003, he was the pitching coach for the Gulf Coast League Reds. He was also the co-owner of a Beef O'Brady's restaurant in Sarasota, Florida, along with former Red Sox teammate Jody Reed.

References

Sources
The Scouting Report: 1992, STATS, INC./John Dewan and Don Zminda editors, HarperPerennial Publishers.

External links

1963 births
Living people
Boston Red Sox players
Cincinnati Reds players
Major League Baseball pitchers
Pawtucket Red Sox players
Florida State Seminoles baseball players
Baseball players from Richmond, Virginia
Nashville Sounds players
Vermont Reds players
Miami Southridge Senior High School alumni
Clearwater Phillies players
Florida Complex League Phillies players